White Sox primarily refers to the Chicago White Sox, a professional baseball team.

White Sox or White socks may also refer to:

Sports

Active baseball and softball teams
New Zealand women's national softball team

Defunct baseball teams
GCL White Sox
Evansville White Sox
Glens Falls White Sox
Louisville White Sox
Monroe White Sox
Philadelphia White Stockings
Tampa White Sox
Wisconsin Rapids White Sox

Renamed baseball teams
Bradenton Marauders, known as the Sarasota White Sox 1989–93.
Bristol Pirates, known as the Bristol White Sox 1995–2013.
Chicago Cubs, originally known as the Chicago White Stockings 1870-71 and 1874–89.
Great Falls Voyagers, known as the Great Falls White Sox 2003–07.
Lockport Locks, known as the Lockford White Sox 1942–43.
Lynchburg Hillcats, known as the Lynchburg White Sox 1963–69.
South Bend Silver Hawks, known as the South Bend White Sox 1988–93.
Tennessee Smokies, known as the Knoxville White Sox 1972–80.

Other uses
White-socks (Middle-earth), an animal in J. R. R. Tolkien's Middle-earth legendarium
White socks (insect), also known as a black fly, any member of the insect family Simuliidae